Paperboys is a Norwegian hip hop-duo consisting of rapper Øyvind "Vinni" Sauvik and DJ Ole Alexander "Pope Dawg" Halstensgård.
The duo has released four albums and their debut included Barcelona, a collaboration with Madcon which was a hit in Norway. After this the pair released several hit singles in Norway but with little to no notable acclaim outside the country. Most of the duo's work uses other artists and relies heavily on YouTube advertising and word of mouth. Including "Moving Up" Featuring Keith & Kleen Cut, "It's Paper", and their most recent hit, "Lonesome Traveller", and they also collaborated with Madcon on their European hit "Back On The Road". The band won the hip hop Spellemannprisen in 2002 and 2005. Paperboys made their return in 2016 with the 'Be Like Water EP', and have continued with an additional single, 'Go Ahead'.

Discography

Albums

Singles

References

External links

 Biography
 Spellemannprisen website

Norwegian hip hop groups
Spellemannprisen winners
Musical groups established in 2002
2002 establishments in Norway
Musical groups from Norway with local place of origin missing
Norwegian musical duos
Hip hop duos